The Dubai International Jazz Festival is an annual music festival which is held in February and takes place in Dubai, United Arab Emirates.

2011 Dubai International Jazz Festival 

The 2011 Dubai International Jazz Festival was held between the 16th and 24 February 2011 at Dubai Media City and featured the following performers:

February 16, 2011
Mica Paris, Alison Moyet, Jools Holland

February 17, 2011
Mindi Abair & Peter White, Macy Gray, Lifehouse

February 18, 2011
Jessy J, Joshua Radin, Train

2012 Dubai International Jazz Festival 

The 2012 Dubai International Jazz Festival was held between the 16th and 24 February 2012 at the Festival Park at the Dubai Festival City. It featured the following performers:

February 16, 2012
Michael Roach, Acoustic Alchemy, James Blunt

February 17, 2012
Jimmy Thomas & Samantha Antoinette, Jonathan Butler, Jools Holland And His Rhythm & Blues Orchestra, Mezzotono

February 23, 2012
Sandi Thom, Spyro Gyra, Jason Mraz

February 24, 2012
Dirty Robbers, Brett Dennen, James Morrison

2016 Dubai International Jazz Festival 

The 2016 Dubai International Jazz Festival was held between the 24th and 26 February 2012 at the Festival Park at the Dubai Festival City. It featured the following performers:

February 24, 2016
Scott Bradlee's Postmodern Jukebox, James

February 25, 2016
David Gray, Toto, Chris Botti feat Sting

February 26, 2016
La Bomba de Tiempo, Santana

See also
 Music of the United Arab Emirates
 Dubai Desert Rock Festival

References

External links
Dubai International Jazz Festival
Real-Yellowpage.com - Chillout Productions
More Than 25,000 Attend Dubai International Jazz Festival. Press release. March 19, 2007
Khaleej Times - Gray matters - 14 January 2008

Jazz festivals in the United Arab Emirates
International Jazz Festival
International Jazz Festival
Winter events in the United Arab Emirates